Little Switzerland may refer to:

In Switzerland
 The Grisons, the largest and most diverse canton of Switzerland

Outside Switzerland
 Little Switzerland (landscape), an area of scenic beauty
 Little Switzerland (Luxembourg), a region of Luxembourg
 Little Switzerland (Lynton & Lynmouth), an area of Exmoor in Devon, England, UK
 Little Switzerland (Shorewood Hills, Arkansas), US
 Little Switzerland, North Carolina, US
 Little Switzerland (Wisconsin), a ski area in Wisconsin, US

See also
 Bariloche, a planned city in the Argentine Andes
 HC Klein Zwitserland, a hockey club from the Hague
 Ifrane, a Moroccan town in the Middle Atlas built by the French colonial administration